Elena Goode is an American actress and Ford model. She is known for her role as Jade Taylor on As the World Turns (2006–2007) and her role as Ma in the 2012 film Elliot Loves.

Personal life
Goode, born in New York City, graduated from the LaGuardia High School of Performing Arts. While a student there, she took part in many productions, including Misanthrope, The Heidi Chronicles, and The Owl and the Pussycat. She graduated from the Fashion Institute of Technology.

Filmography
 2003: Undefeated as Model #1
 2006–2007: As the World Turns as Jade Taylor #1 (February 2, 2006 – July 17, 2007: 188 episodes)
 2009: Circledrawers as Ema
 2012: The Dictator as Virgin Guard 
 2012: Elliot Loves as Ma 
 2012: Gossip Girl as Daphne
 2013: Blue Bloods as Vicky in "No Regrets"
 2015: Straight Outta Compton as Nicole Threatt (Dr. Dre's wife)
 2022: Pretty Little Liars: Original Sin as Marjorie Olivar

References

External links

Actresses from New York City
African-American actresses
American actresses of Puerto Rican descent
American soap opera actresses
Fashion Institute of Technology alumni
Living people
Fiorello H. LaGuardia High School alumni
Year of birth missing (living people)
21st-century African-American people
21st-century African-American women